Cubage is an unincorporated community located in Bell County, Kentucky, United States. Their post office closed in 1989.

According to tradition, someone carved "cub bear killed here" onto a beech tree. Cub Beech, as it was then known, was corrupted into Cubage. A post office was established in 1879.

References
 

Unincorporated communities in Bell County, Kentucky
Unincorporated communities in Kentucky